Giuseppe Motta (died 1929) was an Italian World War I fighter pilot and seaplane air racer of the 1920s.

After World War I, Motta tested racing seaplanes for the Schneider Trophy race. He was killed during a test flight of the Macchi M.67 after having reached . This world record held until George Stainforth broke the  barrier, on 29 September 1931.

1894 births
1929 deaths
Italian aviators
Italian air racers
Italian test pilots
Schneider Trophy pilots
Italian aviation record holders
People from Quargnento